Winton, Stank and Hallikeld is a civil parish in the Hambleton district of North Yorkshire, England.

References

Civil parishes in North Yorkshire